Tensoba, or tempura soba, is a Japanese dish of soba noodles and tempura.

Overview

History
Tensoba originated during the mid-Edo-period. At that time, shrimp-tempura soba was more expensive than other ingredients.

Regional variety
There are some regional varieties for tensoba toppings. These two fish cakes are sometimes batter-fried.

References

Japanese noodle dishes